Simoni Lawrence (born February 1, 1989) is an American-born Canadian football linebacker for the Hamilton Tiger-Cats of the Canadian Football League (CFL). He played college football at Minnesota.

Professional career

St. Louis Rams
Lawrence was signed by the St. Louis Rams as an undrafted free agent on April 26, 2010, but was released one month later.

Hartford Colonials/Philadelphia Eagles
Lawrence was then drafted by the Hartford Colonials 22nd overall in the 2010 UFL Draft on June 2, 2010, but signed with the Philadelphia Eagles on June 8. He was part of the Eagles' final cuts on August 28 and joined the Colonials instead, playing in eight games for the team.

Chicago Bears
After the conclusion of the 2010 UFL season, he signed with the Chicago Bears on December 14, 2010 and spent three weeks on the team's practice roster.

Tampa Bay Buccaneers
He then joined the Tampa Bay Buccaneers on December 30, 2010 and participated in the team's training camp for the 2011 season. However, he was released on September 3, 2011.

Las Vegas Locomotives
Lawrence played in the UFL for the Las Vegas Locomotives in 2011.

Edmonton Eskimos
Lawrence signed with the Edmonton Eskimos of the Canadian Football League on January 10, 2012, playing in 15 games and starting one. Over the course of the season Lawrence contributed 15 tackles, 11 special teams tackles and 1 fumble recovery.

Hamilton Tiger-Cats
During the following off-season, he was traded to the Hamilton Tiger-Cats with Greg Wojt and Jeremiah Masoli for Nathan Kanya and the rights to Carson Rockhill on February 5, 2013. In his first season with the Ti-Cats Lawrence made an immediate impact, amassing 53 tackles, 3 special teams tackles, 1 quarterback sack, and 3 interceptions.

Minnesota Vikings
On February 10, 2014, Lawrence signed with the Minnesota Vikings. He was released on May 13, 2014.

Hamilton Tiger-Cats (II)
As a free-agent Lawrence signed with the Hamilton Tiger-Cats, agreeing to a three-year contract on June 1, 2014. In 2014, Lawrence played in 16 of the 18 regular season games, and both playoff games en route to the team's second consecutive trip to the Grey Cup (the Ti-Cats lost both championship appearances). He led the team in tackles in that season, with 78; while adding 3 sacks, 2 interceptions and 1 fumble recovery. Lawrence continued his stellar play into the 2015 season, accumulating 78 tackles, 5 sacks and 2 interceptions. His performance on the field was recognized when he was named a CFL All-Star. In his fourth season with the Ti-Cats Lawrence set a career-high with 89 tackles, while also contributing 4 sacks and 1 interception for a touchdown. On January 11, 2017 Lawrence and the Ti-Cats agreed to a two-year contract extension.

On February 11, 2019, Lawrence signed a two-year extension with the Tiger-Cats. Lawrence was suspended for two games by the CFL for his hit to the head of Saskatchewan Roughriders quarterback Zach Collaros in his team's 2019 season opener. During Week 14, Lawrence was fined by the CFL for uneccessary roughness, when he twisted Terry Williams' ankle. In Week 15, Lawrence was fined the maximum amount under the CBA for a late hit to the head of Eskimos quarterback Logan Kilgore. On September 30, 2019, Lawrence set a new CFL record for defensive tacles in a single game with 17 made, surpassing Reggie Hunt's previous record of 16. For the 2019 season, he played in 15 regular season games and led the league in defensive tackles with a career-high 98, to go along with three interceptions and four quarterback sacks. For his dominant season, he was named the East Division's Most Outstanding Defensive Player and a CFL All-Star.

On January 19, 2021, it was announced that Lawrence had signed a contract extension with the Tiger-Cats.

References

External links
Just Sports Stats
Hamilton Tiger-Cats bio

1989 births
Living people
African-American players of American football
African-American players of Canadian football
American football linebackers
Canadian football linebackers
Edmonton Elks players
Hamilton Tiger-Cats players
Hartford Colonials players
Las Vegas Locomotives players
Minnesota Golden Gophers football players
People from Upper Darby Township, Pennsylvania
Players of American football from Pennsylvania
Sportspeople from Delaware County, Pennsylvania
21st-century African-American sportspeople
20th-century African-American people